Re-education camp may refer to:

 Re-education camps in the Cambodian Genocide
 Re-education through labor (laojiao), a system of administrative detentions in the People's Republic of China
 Xinjiang re-education camps, internment camps for Uyghurs in Xinjiang, China
 French re-education camps, announced in 2016
 Re-education camp (North Korea)
 Samchung re-education camp, a military detention camp in South Korea during the 1980s
 Re-education camp (Vietnam), prison camps operated by the government of Vietnam following the end of the Vietnam War

See also
 Laogai, Chinese reform through labor camps later renamed "prisons"
 List of re-education through labor camps in China
 Re-education in Communist Romania
 Reeducation (disambiguation)